Johnson Run Natural Area is a  nature preserve located in Cameron County, Pennsylvania.

See also
List of old growth forests

References

Old-growth forests
Protected areas of Cameron County, Pennsylvania